Weightlifting was contested from December 10 to December 17 at the 1970 Asian Games in Bangkok, Thailand. The competition included only men's events for eight different weight categories.

Medalists

Medal table

References
 Results

External links
 Weightlifting Database

 
1970 Asian Games events
1970
Asian Games
Asian